Jens Lööke (born 11 April 1997) is a Swedish professional ice hockey forward. He is currently playing with IF Björklöven in the HockeyAllsvenskan (Allsv) on loan from Vaasan Sport of the Liiga. Lööke was drafted 83rd overall by the Arizona Coyotes in the 2015 NHL Entry Draft.

Playing career
Lööke made his Swedish Hockey League debut playing with Brynäs IF during the 2014–15 SHL season.

Prior to the 2015 NHL Entry Draft, he was seen as one of the top ten international skaters according to the NHL Central Scouting Bureau. He was eventually drafted 83rd overall by the Arizona Coyotes.

On 12 April 2017, Lööke was signed to a three-year entry-level contract with the Arizona Coyotes. After attending the Coyotes training camp, Lööke was assigned to their American Hockey League affiliate, the Tucson Roadrunners.

Following two seasons with the Roadrunners, and despite still having a year to run on his entry-level contract, Lööke opted to return to Sweden for the 2019–20 season, agreeing to a one-year deal with former club, Timrå IK of the Allsvenskan, on May 15, 2019. He was placed on unconditional waivers by the Coyotes and bought out from the final year of his contract on May 17, 2018.

After three seasons with Timrå IK, Lööke opted to sign in the Finnish Liiga, joining Vaasan Sport on a one-year contract on 11 April 2022.

Career statistics

Regular season and playoffs

International

References

External links 

1997 births
Almtuna IS players
Arizona Coyotes draft picks
IF Björklöven players
Brynäs IF players
Living people
People from Gävle
Sportspeople from Gävleborg County
Swedish ice hockey right wingers
Timrå IK players
Tucson Roadrunners players
Vaasan Sport players